"Reach for the Sky" is a song by Japanese singer songwriter Mai Kuraki, taken from her second studio album Perfect Crime (2001). It was released on November 8, 2000 by Giza Studio, simultaneously with her first video album First Cut. The song was written by Kuraki herself and Aika Ohno, while the production was done by Cybersound and served as the theme song to the 2000 Japanese TV program Audrey. The rearranged version of the song "Re:ggae Summer 2013 version" was released digitally on August 17, 2013.

Track listing

Credits and personnel
Credits adapted from CD single liner credits.
 Mai Kuraki – vocals, backing vocals, songwriting
 Aika Ohno – songwriting 
 Cybersound – songwriting 
 Jeffery Quest -  songwriting , backing vocals , rap 
 Paisley -  songwriting 
 Michael Lee -  songwriting , backing vocals 
 Hirohito Furui -  additional songwriting 
 Michael Africk - backing vocals 
 Ricky "Cosmo" Francis - backing vocals 
 Geoffrey Gems - backing vocals 
 Anna Gholston - backing vocals 
 Perry Geyer - sound producer , computer programming , synths 
 Greg Hawks - keyboards 
 Johnny Risk - guitars 
 Masakazu Tomita - system engineer 
 Gomi - remix , programming 
 David Acker - guitars 
 David Darlington - engineer 
 David Sussman - engineer 
 Ken Ishii 2000 - remix , additional production 
 DJ Hiyoco - remix 
 Kenn.nagai - programming , piano 
 Manabu Sakurai - engineer 
 KANONJI - executive producer
 Tokiko Nishimuro - director

Charts

Weekly charts

Monthly charts

Year-end charts

Certification and sales

Release history

References

External links
Mai Kuraki Official Website

2000 singles
Mai Kuraki songs
2000 songs
Giza Studio singles
Songs written by Aika Ohno
Song recordings produced by Daiko Nagato